James Joseph Larrañaga (born October 2, 1949) is the head men's basketball coach for the University of Miami in Coral Gables, Florida. He has held this position since 2011. 

Before joining the University of Miami, he served as the head men's basketball coach at American International College from 1977 to 1979, Bowling Green State University from 1986 to 1997, and George Mason University from  1997 to 2011, where he coached the Patriots to 13 consecutive winning seasons and became a media sensation during the Patriots' improbable run to the Final Four of the 2006 NCAA Division I men's basketball tournament.  Larrañaga has won several national coach of the year awards and over 700 games as a head coach since the late 1970s.

Biography

Early life and education
Larrañaga is one of six children and grew up in the Bronx. He attended Archbishop Molloy High School in Queens, where he started on the basketball varsity team under coach Jack Curran and graduated in 1967. 

He went on to play basketball at Providence College. He was the basketball team captain as a senior in the 1970–71 season and led Providence College to a 20–8 record and an NIT appearance. He graduated as the school's fifth all-time leading scorer with 1,258 points, was the team's top scorer as a sophomore and junior, and was named New England's Division I Sophomore of the Year in 1969. Larrañaga's time at Providence was recognized with his induction into the Providence College Hall of Fame in 1991. He graduated from Providence in 1971 with an economics degree and was selected in the sixth round of the 1971 NBA draft by the Detroit Pistons. He never sought an NBA career, opting instead to go into coaching.

Larrañaga's grandfather was born in Cuba of Basque parents and was part of Cuba's Por Larrañaga cigar company. He is the father of Jay Larranaga, an assistant coach of the NBA's Los Angeles Clippers.

Coaching career
Immediately after graduating from Providence, Larrañaga took a job as an assistant to Terry Holland at Davidson College, also serving as the freshman team coach. In his five years under Holland, Davidson won three regular-season Southern Conference titles and reached the NIT once, and he also amassed a 47–12 record as freshman coach. In 1976, he moved to Belgium in order to serve as player-coach for a professional club, but only stayed there for one season.

He returned to the U.S. in 1977 for his first head coaching job at American International College, a Division II program which had losing records in the previous five years. In two years at AIC, his teams had a 28–25 record, including a win against Northeastern University, whose team was coached by Jim Calhoun at that time. In 1979, he was reunited with his former Davidson mentor Holland, who by now had become the head coach at the University of Virginia. Larrañaga became an assistant at a program that had begun to emerge as a power in the ACC, arriving at the same time as highly touted freshman Ralph Sampson. In seven seasons at Virginia, Larrañaga was on the bench for an NIT title in 1980 and NCAA Final Four berths in 1981 and 1984.

Bowling Green
In 1986, Larrañaga left Virginia for the head coaching job at Bowling Green State University. In his first season there, the Falcons improved by eight games over the 1985–86 season, finishing 15–14. He went on to record a 170–144 record in 11 years there, and was only the second coach in Bowling Green history to take the Falcons to postseason play in consecutive years (the 1990 and 1991 editions of the NIT). During his tenure at Bowling Green the Falcons defeated the perennial national powers Kentucky, Michigan State (twice), Ohio State, Penn State and Purdue. In his final season at Bowling Green (1996–97), he led the Falcons to a regular-season co-championship in the Mid-American Conference and another NIT berth, and was also named the conference's Coach of the Year. He is still the second-winningest coach in school history (behind only Hall of Famer Harold Anderson), as well as one of the winningest coaches in the Mid-American Conference. One notable NBA player who played for Larrañaga was guard Antonio Daniels, who was selected fourth overall in the 1997 draft.

George Mason
Larrañaga arrived at George Mason in 1997. His first team only went 9–18, but signs of improvement were present. In the 1998–99 season, the Patriots went 19–11, won the school's first Colonial Athletic Association regular-season title in history, and won the conference tournament to advance to the NCAA tournament. The Patriots would again go to the NCAA tournament in 2001 and two NITs in 2002 and 2004. The 2004 team was notable as Mason's first 20-win team in 14 years, and also won consecutive postseason games for the first time in school history.

2004–05 season

The 2004–05 team, with three junior starters but dominated by freshmen and sophomores, went 16–13. However, these players would prove themselves the following season.

2005–06: The dream season

The Patriots entered the 2005–06 season as a strong contender for the CAA title. They entered the conference tournament 22–6, finishing in a tie for the regular-season title with UNC Wilmington. Near the end of the regular season, they were briefly ranked in the Top 25 in the ESPN/USA Today poll, the school's first ranking ever, and were on the brink of making it to the Associated Press poll. They also narrowly lost to Wake Forest and Mississippi State, and survived a tough match at Wichita State in the ESPN-sponsored BracketBusters event.

However, from Mason's perspective, the CAA tournament would not live up to their expectations. The Patriots survived an overtime scare in the quarterfinals from Georgia State, and then lost to Hofstra in the semifinals. During that match, starting guard Tony Skinn hit a Hofstra player below the belt, earning a one-game suspension for his action. Many observers considered Mason to be "on the bubble" for an NCAA bid; some believed that Skinn's suspension would lead the NCAA Selection Committee to leave Mason out of the field. However, the committee put the Patriots in the field, making them the first at-large team from the CAA in 20 years. Some commentators, notably Billy Packer, criticized Mason's entry in the tournament.

The Patriots would enter the tournament as a No. 11 seed in the Washington, D.C. Regional, facing 2005 Final Four participant Michigan State. They pulled a 75–65 upset, giving Larrañaga and George Mason their first NCAA tournament victory ever. Next was a matchup against defending national champion North Carolina. Prior to the game, Larrañaga famously told his players: "Their fans think they're supermen. Our fans know we're kryptonite."  The Patriots found themselves in a 16–2 hole, but climbed out of it to win 65–60 and advance to the regional site at the Verizon Center, about 30 minutes away from their campus.

The Patriots next won a rematch with Wichita State, controlling the game throughout and winning 63–55. That put them in the regional final against 2004 champions and regional top seed Connecticut. The Patriots trailed by as much as 12 during the first half, and by nine early in the second. However, they would storm back to make the game close the rest of the way. Larrañaga would motivate his team during timeouts by telling his players that the UConn players didn't know what conference George Mason was in. He told them that on this day "CAA" stood for "Connecticut Assassins Association." Mason would win 86–84 in overtime, becoming only the fourth team not from a BCS AQ conference to make the Final Four in a quarter-century (after UNLV in 1987 and 1991 and Utah in 1998). Their improbable run ended on April 1 in Indianapolis when they lost 73–58 to eventual national champion Florida in the national semifinals.

Larrañaga received the Clair Bee Coach of the Year Award for his accomplishments during this season. Larrañaga's overall head coaching record going into the Final Four was 366–273.

2010–11: The Revival

The 2010–2011 season brought great promise for the Patriots. Led by seniors Cam Long and Isiah Tate, the Patriots' campaign started off with mixed emotions as they dropped two games vs NC State and Wofford. From then, the Patriots sparked a seven-game winning streak including a key home win in the 'Battle of the Orange Line' versus George Washington University. The following four games proved to be a test as GMU traveled to the University of Dayton, played at home versus the University of Delaware, and away at both Hofstra University and at Old Dominion University. After the lowly spell of dropping three of those four, the Patriots became red hot as they went undefeated during the regular season winning 16 straight games including a crucial conference game at Virginia Commonwealth University. Heading into the CAA tournament, the ESPN/USA Today Coaches' Poll ranked George Mason as the number 25 team in the country, which was their first national ranking since 2006 when they made the improbable run to the Final Four. Senior Cam Long was voted first team all-conference and Coach Larrañaga was awarded the coach of the year. GMU would fall from the rankings after a semifinal loss to VCU in the conference tournament.

In the 2011 NCAA Tournament, Mason was assigned a No. 8 seed and faced off against No. 9 seed and Big East stalwart Villanova. In a seesaw game, Mason pulled out the victory when Luke Hancock knocked down a late three, and Mike Morrison threw down a last-second breakaway dunk. In the next round, Mason lost to No. 1 overall seed Ohio State.

Other achievements

As of February 2011, Larrañaga's 271 career wins at Mason makes him the winningest coach in the history of both the school and the CAA. He has won CAA Coach of the Year twice, in 1999 and in 2011. The latter award came after the Patriots reeled off a school-record 15 straight wins to finish the regular season, remaining undefeated at the Patriot Center, setting a school record for regular-season wins (25), and securing the No. 1 seed heading into the CAA tournament.

University of Miami

On April 22, 2011, Larrañaga accepted the head coaching position at the University of Miami. In his first season at Miami, he led the team to a 9–7 record in-conference, which marked the university's first ever winning record in the ACC.

In his second season, Larrañaga led the Hurricanes to arguably their best season since the Rick Barry era, winning the ACC regular season title. It represented the first time in 11 years and only the fourth time in 32 years that a team not from North Carolina had won at least a share of the title. The highlight of the season was an unprecedented 90-63 rout of top-ranked Duke, which represented Miami's first-ever defeat of a top-ranked team and the largest margin of defeat for a top-ranked team ever.

On March 17, 2013, Larrañaga coached the Hurricanes to the ACC tournament title—the first tournament title in the program's history — with an 87-77 win over North Carolina. On April 4, 2013, Larrañaga was voted the Associated Press' college basketball coach of the year. A week later, the Hurricanes advanced to the Sweet 16 of the NCAA tournament with their school-record 29th win. The season ended the following weekend with a loss to Marquette. He claimed the Hurricanes had not enough energy to win the game because of Reggie Johnson's injury and Shane Larkin's sickness.

Academic activities
In August 2007, Larrañaga was appointed as an associate professor in the George Mason University School of Management (SOM) in the school's Executive MBA program. Although his basketball schedule only allowed him to teach part-time, he was a frequent presenter in classes on leadership, management, and team development, and often spoke at school-sponsored seminars. He had been a guest lecturer at SOM since arriving at George Mason in 1997.

Head coaching record

See also
 List of college men's basketball coaches with 600 wins
 List of NCAA Division I Men's Final Four appearances by coach

References

External links
 Miami profile

1949 births
Living people
American men's basketball coaches
American men's basketball players
American International Yellow Jackets men's basketball coaches
American people of Basque descent
American people of Cuban descent
Archbishop Molloy High School alumni
Basketball coaches from New York (state)
Basketball players from New York City
Bowling Green Falcons men's basketball coaches
College men's basketball head coaches in the United States
Davidson Wildcats men's basketball coaches
Detroit Pistons draft picks
George Mason Patriots men's basketball coaches
George Mason University faculty
Miami Hurricanes men's basketball coaches
Providence Friars men's basketball players
Sportspeople from the Bronx
Virginia Cavaliers men's basketball coaches